B. foliata may refer to:

 Barbatia foliata, an ark clam species in the genus Barbatia found in the Houtman Abrolhos islands, Western Australia 
 Bufonaria foliata, a sea snail species

See also
 Foliata (disambiguation)